Keshod Airport  is a public airport located in Keshod, in the state of Gujarat, India. It primarily serves the cities of Junagadh and Veraval and the surrounding region.

History
Keshod Airport was built by the Nawab of Junagadh, Mahabatkhanji III for his private use, by acquiring land from Kotadias (the Patel community). The airport was refurbished and revived in the late 1980s to facilitate scheduled operations. The last airline to fly here was Jet Airways, which ceased flying to Keshod in 2000.

Airlines and destinations 
 
Alliance Air was supposed to start a flight to Mumbai from 1 April 2019 as per UDAN scheme launched by the government, but due to shortfalls in the airport facilities observed during inspection had to postpone the commencement of flights. Alliance Air finally announced that it will commence flights to Mumbai from 12th March 2022.

References

External links 
 

Junagadh district
Airports in Gujarat
Junagadh
Year of establishment missing